The Doppelganger, also called the Spider-Doppelganger, is a fictional character and supervillain appearing in American comic books published by Marvel Comics. It is a near-mindless duplicate of Spider-Man with a vicious, animal-like mind who primarily acts as a servant to other villains rather than having a full will of its own. Along with Peter Parker's agility, speed, and power to cling to walls, the Spider-Doppelganger possesses greater strength, six arms, talons, and organic web-spinnerets on each forearm that fire "razor-sharp" webbing.

Publication history
Doppelganger first appeared in The Infinity War #1 in 1992 and was created by Jim Starlin, Ron Lim, and Al Milgrom. The issue featured multiple superheroes being attacked by demonic doubles (referred to as doppelgängers), mutated and sent by the series villain Magus. Spider-Man's battle is unseen, but it is shown that his personal double (which the hero later refers to as the "Spider-Doppelganger" or simply "the Doppelganger") winds up dead. The same month, Spider-Man #24 (1992) presented a full version of the battle and revealed that afterward, the villain Demogoblin revives Spider-Man's doppelganger. While the Magus's other doubles are destroyed by the end of The Infinity War, Demogoblin's intervention apparently allows the Spider-Doppelganger to survive.

The Doppelganger acts as Demongoblin's servant in Web of Spider-Man #94-96 (1992) and then becomes pet to the villains Shriek and Carnage in the 1993 storyline Maximum Carnage, where it apparently met its death. That story, along with the video game adaptation Spider-Man and Venom: Maximum Carnage, led to a large number of Spider-Man fans becoming familiar with the Spider-Doppelganger. 17 years after its apparent death, the character returned in the series Carnage in 2010. In that story and most appearances since the creature is still associated with Carnage and Shriek.

Fictional character biography
During the battle known as the Infinity War, the Magus (a manifestation of all the evil inherent in Adam Warlock) visited the other-dimensional entity Anthropomorpho, director of the Manifestation race. The Manifestations are inorganic "fractual" beings, not truly living in the traditional sense, that would be altered into avatars or "M-bodies" for powerful and cosmic entities. For the Magus, Anthropomorpho engineered several Manifestations to become monstrous "doppelgängers" of Earth's superheroes, creating a small army. Some of these doppelgangers made advance strikes on Earth's heroes, attempting to defeat and then merge with them, taking over the hero's identity. One such Doppelganger is a bloodthirsty, near-mindless duplicate of Spider-Man. The Spider-Doppelganger confronts the hero in a battle that ends up involving Demogoblin and Hobgoblin. Intending to kill Spider-Man, Hobgoblin unintentionally seems to kill the Spider-Doppelganger instead. After Spider-Man leaves to find help and information, the Demogoblin revives the hero's monstrous double with supernatural energy. When the Magus is defeated, all his Manifestation troops are undone, except for Spider-Man's doppelganger.

Demogoblin recruits the surviving Doppelganger as his aid against Spider-Man and Hobgoblin, leading to the pair also encountering Ghost Rider, Blaze, the demonic Deathspawn, and Spider-Man's enemy Venom. Separating from Demogoblin, the bestial Doppelganger eventually encounters the mass murderers Carnage and Shriek, the latter of whom adopts the creature as a loyal pet. Joined by Demogoblin and Carrion, the group engages on a campaign of terror and murder. The creature comes to see Shriek as a mother and later defends her from attack by an enraged Carnage, who in turn delivers several fatal stab wounds to the Spider-Doppelganger before knocking it off a rooftop. The creature is seemingly dead on impact with the street below.

Doppelganger turns up alive years later, now capable of some speech and with an altered appearance, its form apparently still malleable since it is of the Manifestation race. Attempting to free Shriek, it fails and is seemingly killed again, only to then wake up on an autopsy table. After Shriek is finally freed being held by authorities and the mental hospital Ravencroft Institute, she and the Doppelganger wreak new havoc on New York. After a battle with the new symbiote Scorn, the creature flees with Carnage. Carnage then overtakes a Colorado town with the Doppelganger's aid, but the creature flees when the villain is captured.

The Spider-Doppelganger is shown among the Spiders assembled to help combat Morlun and the other Inheritors in the Spider-Verse storyline. The creature eventually reunites with Carnage and Shriek when they form a cult dedicated to worshiping Knull.

Powers and abilities
The Doppelganger's abilities are very similar to Spider-Man's, including superhuman agility, stamina, reflexes, and speed. While Spider-Man's superhuman strength limit is around 10 tons, the Spider-Doppelganger's superior strength can press approximately 65 tons. The creature can also cling to walls and surfaces through will. Instead of relying on artificial web-shooters, it has organic spinnerets that shoot razor-sharp webbing from the palms of its hands. It has two extra sets of arms, each hand possessing hardened talons that can easily tear through human tissue. 

The Spider-Doppelganger is savage and largely unintelligent, seemingly limited to animal instinct, although it was capable of following basic instructions from its 'mother' Shriek. When it reappeared years later with a different body, it was capable of rudimentary speech. Its body is also somewhat malleable, although this attribute was not apparent during its earliest stories and Maximum Carnage. According to scientists who briefly studied him after one of his apparent deaths, Doppelganger is "inorganic and may not have been legally alive, to begin with." This, along with the supernatural energy Demogoblin infused it with, may account for the creature's repeated resurrections.

Reception
 In 2022, CBR.com ranked Doppelganger 7th in their "10 Most Violent Spider-Man Villains" list.

Other versions

Spider-Man: Clone Saga
 Doppelganger is referenced in the alternate universe of the Clone Saga.

Deadpool Kills the Marvel Universe Again
 A brainwashed Deadpool has an illusion of Doppelganger in Deadpool Kills the Marvel Universe Again.

In other media

Television
A hallucination of Doppelganger appears in the Spider-Man episode "The Wedding", in which a mentally ill Harry Osborn suffers from nightmares and views Spider-Man as Doppelganger.

Video games
 Doppelganger appears as a recurring boss in Spider-Man and Venom: Maximum Carnage.
 Doppelganger appears as a playable character in Spider-Man Unlimited.

Merchandise
 Doppelganger received a figure in Toy Biz's Spider-Man Classics line.
 Doppelganger received a figure in Diamond Select Toys's "Marvel Minimates" line.
 Doppelganger received a figure in Hasbro's Marvel Legends line.

References

External links
 Doppelganger at Marvel.com
 
 Profile at Spiderfan.org

Comics characters introduced in 1992
Characters created by Al Milgrom
Characters created by Jim Starlin
Marvel Comics characters who can move at superhuman speeds
Marvel Comics characters with superhuman strength
Marvel Comics supervillains
Spider-Man characters
Fictional servants